The following is a list of Michigan State Historic Sites in Ottawa County, Michigan. Sites marked with a dagger (†) are also listed on the National Register of Historic Places in Ottawa County, Michigan.


Current listings

See also
 National Register of Historic Places listings in Ottawa County, Michigan

Sources
 Historic Sites Online – Ottawa County. Michigan State Housing Developmental Authority. Accessed May 29, 2011.

References

Ottawa County
State Historic Sites
Tourist attractions in Ottawa County, Michigan